CID Shankar is a 1970 Indian Tamil-language spy thriller film, directed by R. Sundaram, produced by Modern Theatres and written by A. L. Narayanan. Music was by Vedha. It stars Jaishankar, A. Sakunthala, and Thengai Srinivasan. V. S. Raghavan, R. S. Manohar, C. L. Anandan, Jayakumari, B. V. Radha and M. Bhanumathi play supporting roles. The film was a remake of the 1965 French/Italian co-production Eurospy film OSS 117 Mission for a Killer. It was an average success. Sakunthala became known as "CID Sakunthala" after the film's release.

Plot
The film begins (in its title sequence) with a politician being killed by a suicide bomber, who detonates her explosive belt. C. I. D. Shankar and his assistant Raju (Thengai Srinivasan) are deputed to the Nilgiris to investigate a case of mysterious murder. C. I. D. Ashokan (Pakkirisamy) also stays at the town, who poses as an herbal researcher, his close relation is lover's club dancer Reeta (Jayakumari). Ashokan finds out the truth, and he goes to Nagamalai estate, where he gives a lift to a young girl who explodes her belt. Ashokan gives a diary and a locker key to Vithya (CID Sakunthala), who saves his life and admits him into the hospital. But unfortunately, Ashokan is killed by a mysterious gang in hospital. Vithya  gives the things to Shankar, and both fall in love. Raju falls in love with actress Rama (Kumari Radha), who also stays in the same hotel. Shankar meets Reeta and asks her to help him. She gives information to his assistant Raju and later on, she is killed by the same mysterious gang. Vithya asks help from her brother Sundaram (Vennira Aadai Moorthy) for the herbal details.

Sundaram meets his friend Boopathy (R. S. Manohar). Shankar was introduced to Boopathy by himself as an herbal researcher who gives the helpful information of the drug's details. Some particular herb grows at Nagamalai Estate inside the forest named the black forest, that herbal name was Arome and was produced into a drug. The drug was injected into the human body, which goes into hypnosis, and that person is used for the gang's illegal works. Boopathy receives Shankar, Vithya and her brother Sundaram and they go into the forest. They realise Boopathy is also one of the mysterious gangs, and they meet the gang leader in their hidden secret place. Shankar discovers that the murders are being committed by a terrorist gang, who are embarking on a secret movement. Vidya and Sundaram question Boopathy about their organisation, whether it kills their friends, relatives and families. By hearing this, Boopathi changes his mind and rescues Vidya, Sundaram, Raju, Shankar and others. Will CID Shankar, he able to accomplish his mission? Finally, Shankar is against gun fighting with the gang, and in this shooting, Boopathy dies and saves Vithya's life.

Cast
Cast according to the opening credits of the film

Male Cast
 Jaishankar as CID Shankar
 O. A. K. Thevar as Gang Leader
 Thengai Srinivasan as Raju
 V. S. Raghavan as DIG of Police
 C. L. Anandan
 Pakkirisamy as Ashokan
 Moorthy as Sundaram
 Manohar as Bhoopathi

Female Cast
 A. Sakunthala as Vidhya 
 B. V. Radha as Rama
 Jayakumari as Rita
 Vijayamala as Fake Sujatha Rani
 M. Bhanumathi as Sujatha Rani

Soundtrack
Music was composed by Vedha and lyrics were written by Kannadasan. The song "Andha Arayinale" was composed by lifting two popular Hindi song Yeh Dil Na Hota Bechara and Dil Se Dil Milakar Dekho. Nanathalie Kannam song inspired by Jewel Thief Hindi movie song Dil Pukare Aa Re.

References

External links 
 

1970 films
1970s action thriller films
1970s spy thriller films
1970s Tamil-language films
Fictional portrayals of the Tamil Nadu Police
Films about organised crime in India
Indian action thriller films
Indian black-and-white films
Indian remakes of French films
Indian spy thriller films
Films scored by Vedha (composer)